Ştefan Tudor (3 March 194315 February 2021) was a Romanian rower.

Career
He competed at the 1968, 1972 and 1976 Olympics in the coxed fours, coxed pairs and coxless fours events, respectively, and won a bronze medal in 1972. In 1970 he became the first world champion in rowing from Romania. He also won two bronze medals at the European championships in 1967 and 1973. He died less than one month short of his 78th birthday.

References

External links
 
 
 
 

1943 births
2021 deaths
Romanian male rowers
Olympic rowers of Romania
Rowers at the 1968 Summer Olympics
Rowers at the 1972 Summer Olympics
Rowers at the 1976 Summer Olympics
Olympic bronze medalists for Romania
Olympic medalists in rowing
World Rowing Championships medalists for Romania
Medalists at the 1972 Summer Olympics
European Rowing Championships medalists
Date of death missing
Place of death missing
People from Prahova County